In Greek mythology, Ialmenus or Ialmenos (Ancient Greek: Ἰάλμενος) was a son of Ares and Astyoche, and twin brother of Ascalaphus. Together with his brother he sailed with the Argonauts, was among the suitors of Helen, and led the Orchomenian contingent in the Trojan War.

Unlike Ascalaphus, Ialmenus survived the war. He was said to have ended up in Colchis, where he founded a colony, the inhabitants of which were later referred to as the "Achaeans of Pontus".

See also 
 21602 Ialmenus, Jovian asteroid

Notes

References 

 Apollodorus, The Library with an English Translation by Sir James George Frazer, F.B.A., F.R.S. in 2 Volumes, Cambridge, MA, Harvard University Press; London, William Heinemann Ltd. 1921. ISBN 0-674-99135-4. Online version at the Perseus Digital Library. Greek text available from the same website.
 Homer, The Iliad with an English Translation by A.T. Murray, Ph.D. in two volumes. Cambridge, MA., Harvard University Press; London, William Heinemann, Ltd. 1924. . Online version at the Perseus Digital Library.
 Homer, Homeri Opera in five volumes. Oxford, Oxford University Press. 1920. . Greek text available at the Perseus Digital Library.
 Pausanias, Description of Greece with an English Translation by W.H.S. Jones, Litt.D., and H.A. Ormerod, M.A., in 4 Volumes. Cambridge, MA, Harvard University Press; London, William Heinemann Ltd. 1918. . Online version at the Perseus Digital Library
 Pausanias, Graeciae Descriptio. 3 vols. Leipzig, Teubner. 1903.  Greek text available at the Perseus Digital Library.
 Strabo, The Geography of Strabo. Edition by H.L. Jones. Cambridge, Mass.: Harvard University Press; London: William Heinemann, Ltd. 1924. Online version at the Perseus Digital Library.
 Strabo, Geographica edited by A. Meineke. Leipzig: Teubner. 1877. Greek text available at the Perseus Digital Library.
Argonauts
Achaean Leaders
Children of Ares
Demigods in classical mythology

Minyan characters in Greek mythology